Nangang District is one of nine districts of the prefecture-level city of Harbin, the capital of Heilongjiang Province, Northeast China, forming part of the city's urban core. It is home to major offices of the provincial government and is the political heart of Heilongjiang province. Other areas of interest within the district are the Harbin Railway Station, Guomao underground shopping street, a Confucian temple and the Buddhist Jile Temple. By far the most populous and densely populated of Harbin's county-level divisions, it borders the districts of Daowai and Xiangfang to the northeast, Pingfang to the southeast, Shuangcheng to the south, and Daoli to the west. A new subway system is also being built currently.

Nangang district is also famous by the business area around the Hongbo square, there are several shopping centers such as Qiulin corporation, Harbin No. 1 shopping center corporation, Yuanda shopping center.

The central part of Nangang includes the Harbin Institute of Technology, Northern Theater, and the First Affiliated Hospital of Harbin Medical University.

There are also many famous streets in Nangang District, such as Tieling Street, Guogeli Street, Anshan Street, Longjiang Street, Jilin Street, Ashihe Street, etc.

Nangang district also has many excellent schools, such as No. 69 middle school and Harbin No 3 High School.

Administrative divisions
There are 18 subdistricts, one town, and one ethnic township in the district: 

Subdistricts:

Town:
Wanggang

The only ethic township is Hongqi Manchu Ethnic Township

References

External links
Official website of Nangang District government

Districts of Harbin